This is a list of seasons completed by the Jacksonville Dolphins football team. The Dolphins had last competed in the Pioneer Football League as a member of the NCAA Division I FCS. The program began in 1998 as a Division I-AA Independent, and joined the Pioneer League in 2001 until 2019. On December 3, 2019, the university announced it would discontinue its football program, effective immediately.

Seasons

References

Jacksonville

Jacksonville, Florida-related lists
Florida sports-related lists